Hilevich (Polonized: Gilewicz , Russified: Gilevich) is a Belarusian language surname derived from the word 'гіль', bullfinch with a patronymic suffix '-ich'. It may refer to:

 Radosław Gilewicz (born 1971), Polish footballer
 Nil Hilevich (1931–2016), Belarusian poet
  (born Mikalai Hilevich in 1936), Belarusian writer and journalist
 Wiktor Gilewicz (1907–1948), Polish military officer

See also

References

Polish-language surnames
Belarusian-language surnames